Chris Evert was the defending champion of the singles event at the Virginia Slims of Los Angeles tennis tournament but did not compete that year.

Martina Navratilova won in the final 6–0, 6–2 against Gabriela Sabatini.

Seeds
A champion seed is indicated in bold text while text in italics indicates the round in which that seed was eliminated. The top eight seeds received a bye to the second round.

  Martina Navratilova (champion)
  Gabriela Sabatini (final)
  Zina Garrison (semifinals)
  Pam Shriver (semifinals)
  Mary Joe Fernández (quarterfinals)
  Helen Kelesi (third round)
  Hana Mandlíková (quarterfinals)
  Catarina Lindqvist (quarterfinals)
  Raffaella Reggi (first round)
  Patty Fendick (second round)
  Lori McNeil (first round)
  Nathalie Tauziat (quarterfinals)
  Claudia Kohde-Kilsch (second round)
  Terry Phelps (third round)
  Gretchen Magers (third round)
  Amy Frazier (third round)

Draw

Finals

Top half

Section 1

Section 2

Bottom half

Section 3

Section 4

References
 1989 Virginia Slims of Los Angeles Draw

LA Women's Tennis Championships
1989 WTA Tour